Svenska Basketligan, or the Swedish Basketball League (SBL), is the premier league for professional basketball in Sweden. The league was originally established in 1992 as Basketligan and was known as that prior to the season of 2006–07, but when the Swedish company Obol Investment signed an agreement with the Swedish Basketball Federation in early October 2006, the league was renamed Obol Basketball League (OBL). In January 2007 the name was changed to Ligan, meaning simply the League.

History
On October 6, 2006, the Swedish Basketball Federation signed a 15-year agreement with Swiss company Obol Investment. Part of the deal was that Basketligan would be renamed Obol Basketball League. Other parts of the deal include that the winning team would receive prize money if the team were to play in the EuroLeague during the following season. The agreement lasted for 15 years, but after five years Obol would make an evaluation and have the rights to then cancel the deal, if they so wish.

Current teams

Finals

Performance by club
Teams in italic are no longer active.

Awards

See also
List of sporting events in Sweden
Basketligan All-Star Game

Notes

References

External links
Official page on the Swedish Basketball Federation web 
Official website 
Independent site of Swedish basketball 
Swedish league on Eurobasket.com

    
    
Sweden
1992 establishments in Sweden
Sports leagues established in 1992
Professional sports leagues in Sweden